Franconia Sculpture Park is an outdoor sculpture park in Franconia, Minnesota, United States, that offers a 50-acre outdoor museum, active artist residency program, and a depth and breadth of community arts programming for a diverse and engaged public.    The  park, with a rotating collection of over 100 contemporary sculptures, and is free and open to the public from 8am-8pm daily. The park draws over 180,000 visitors annually.

On September 26, 2020, Franconia Sculpture Park opened Franconia Commons, a lively civic space that includes a visitor center, gift shop, restrooms, seasonal cafe, the Driscoll Education Center and the Mardag Gallery.  Franconia Commons is open Apr. 15 – Nov. 14: Daily, 9am-5pm; Nov. 15 – Apr. 14: Friday-Sunday, 10am-4pm; and is closed on National Holidays.

Franconia Sculpture Park is located at the intersection of U.S. Route 8 and Minnesota State Highway 95 near Taylors Falls, in the St. Croix River Valley region of Minnesota.

History
Franconia Sculpture Park was founded in 1996 by a small group of artists including Tasha Hock, John Hock, and Fuller Cowles. Since 1996, Franconia has established a reputation as one of the country's most innovative sculpture parks. From 2011 to 2018, Franconia established Franconia in the City, a  gallery and education space at the Casket Arts Community Complex in Northeast Minneapolis. The park is governed by a board of directors that in 2021 includes Sara Rothholz Weiner, Heather Rutledge, Kevin Riach, Sharon Louden, Rosie Kellogg, Esther Callahan, Eric Bruce,  Linda Seebauer Hansen, Stacy O'Reilly, Nora Kaitfors, Beth Theobald.

In 2009 Franconia was the only Minnesota arts organization outside of the Twin Cities to receive National Endowment for the Arts/American Recovery and Reinvestment Act funding.  In 2010 the park was among the selected grantees to receive part of the $20 million allocation from the state of Minnesota's Arts and Cultural Heritage Fund.

Artist development
Franconia offers fellowship, internship, and workshop programs that support visual artists at all levels of their career as they create new sculpture to be sited specifically at the park.  Artists are creating new work at the park from April through November. The program is publicized by actively soliciting artists' proposals locally, nationally, and internationally.  Each year Franconia supports over 40 artists as they create and exhibit new work. Since their founding in 1996, Franconia has supported nearly 800 national and international visual artists.

Arts learning
In 2013 Franconia launched the Rural Arts Program, with support provided by a Minnesota State Arts Board Arts Access grant, which in its first year served 1,213 rural youth, encouraging interaction and engagement with art and artists. In addition, Franconia has a schedule of exhibition tours, art-making workshops, cast metal sculpture demonstrations, and diverse cultural programming that serves over 14,000 arts learners each year.

Special events
Each year Franconia hosts monthly Dinner & Discussion lectures, dog-friendly Yappy Hours, Music @ Franconia concerts, Film @ Franconia film series, Art & Farmers Markets (first Sunday of the month May - Oct), the Art & Artists Celebration in September, Frost Fest in December, and a Community Ice Rink in January and February.

References

External links
 

1996 establishments in Minnesota
Art galleries established in 1996
Arts centers in Minnesota
Contemporary art galleries in the United States
Roadside attractions in Minnesota
Sculpture gardens, trails and parks in the United States
Tourist attractions in Chisago County, Minnesota